The Azerbaijan men's national under-18 basketball team is a national basketball team of Azerbaijan, administered by the Azerbaijan Basketball Federation. It represents the country in international men's under-18 basketball competitions.

FIBA U18 European Championship participations

See also
Azerbaijan men's national basketball team
Azerbaijan men's national under-16 basketball team

References

External links
Archived records of Azerbaijan team participations

Basketball in Azerbaijan
Azerbaijan national basketball team
National sports teams of Azerbaijan
Men's national under-18 basketball teams